Jakkapan Pornsai (born March 28, 1987), simply known as Ball, is a Thai professional footballer who plays as a winger for Thai League 2 club Ayutthaya United and the Thailand national team.

Career

Police United and Muangthong United 

Jakkapan started his career in Police United during 2009, and moved to Muangthong United in 2011, where he got a successful career include winning the champion of 2012 TPL. Jakkapan stayed for 3 years and scored 9 goals for Muangthong United.

Suphanburi 

Jakkapan joined Suphanburi in 2014 and signed 3 years contract. In his first season, he scored 4 league goals in 26 games.

In 2015, Jakkapan had a great season as he scored 13 goals and also provided 14 assists, helped the team to secure the third place of 2015 TPL. Jakkapan scored 4 goals in first 5 matches, earned the February Thai Premier League Player of the Month. At the end of the season, Goal.com also selected Jakkapan in the best XI of 2015 TPL.

In 2016, Jakkapan scored 2 penalties in 13 matches before moving to Bangkok Glass.

Bangkok Glass 

26 May 2016, Jakkapan joined Bangkok Glass. He scored 5 goals for Glass before moving to Bangkok United.

Bangkok United 

Bangkok United have completed the signing of Jakkapan on 10 June 2017. He joined Ratchaburi Mitr Phol FC during the second-leg of 2018 season

Ratchaburi Mitr Phol 

After being loaned from Bangkok United for half of season 2018 and completing season 2019 in Ratchaburi, the winger finally committed to remain at Ratchaburi Mitr Phol FC until the end of his footballing career, starting the 2020 season.

International career

Jakkapan selected into national team in 2011 and he is part of Thailand's 2012 AFF Suzuki Cup.

In May 2015, he was called up by Thailand to play in the 2018 FIFA World Cup qualification (AFC) against Vietnam.

Statistics

International

International goals

Honours

Club
Muangthong united
 Thai League 1 (1): 2012

Individual
 Thai League T1 Player of the Month (1): February 2015

References

External links
 
 
 Profile at Goal

1987 births
Living people
Jakkapan Pornsai
Jakkapan Pornsai
Association football wingers
Jakkapan Pornsai
Jakkapan Pornsai
Jakkapan Pornsai
Jakkapan Pornsai
Jakkapan Pornsai
Jakkapan Pornsai
Jakkapan Pornsai
Footballers at the 2010 Asian Games
Jakkapan Pornsai